Melissa Duncan (born 30 January 1990) is an Australian middle-distance runner who competes primarily in the 1500 metres. She competed at the 2015 World Championships and 2016 World Indoor Championships.

Competition record

Personal bests
Outdoor
800 metres – 2:08.1 (Melbourne 2013)
1500 metres – 4:05.56 (Oslo 2015)
One Mile – 4:26.90 (Dublin 2014)
3000 metres – 8:58.14 (Cork 2014)
Indoor
1500 metres – 4:06.93 (Boston 2016)

References

External links
 

1990 births
Living people
Australian female middle-distance runners
Australian Athletics Championships winners
Athletes (track and field) at the 2014 Commonwealth Games
Athletes from Melbourne
World Athletics Championships athletes for Australia
Commonwealth Games competitors for Australia
LGBT track and field athletes
20th-century Australian women
21st-century Australian women